High-mannose-oligosaccharide beta-1,4-N-acetylglucosaminyltransferase, uridine diphosphoacetylglucosamine-oligosaccharide acetylglucosaminyltransferase, acetylglucosamine-oligosaccharide acetylglucosaminyltransferase, UDP-GlcNAc:oligosaccharide beta-N-acetylglucosaminyltransferase, UDP-N-acetyl-D-glucosamine:high-mannose-oligosaccharide beta-1,4-N-acetylglucosaminyltransferase) is an enzyme with systematic name UDP-N-acetyl-D-glucosamine:high-mannose-oligosaccharide 4-beta-N-acetylglucosaminyltransferase. This enzyme catalyses the following chemical reaction

 Transfers an N-acetyl-D-glucosamine residue from UDP-N-acetyl-D-glucosamine to the 4-position of a mannose linked alpha-(1->6) to the core mannose of high-mannose oligosaccharides produced by Dictyostelium discoideum

The activity of the intersecting mannose residue as acceptor is dependent on two other mannose residues attached by alpha-1,3 and alpha-1,6 links.

References

External links 
 

EC 2.4.1